is a public holiday in Japan that occurs on the date of the Northward equinox in Japan Standard Time (the vernal equinox can occur on different dates in different time-zones), usually March 20 or 21. The date of the holiday is not officially declared until February of the previous year, due to the need for recent astronomical measurements.

Vernal Equinox Day became a public holiday in 1948. Like other Japanese holidays, this holiday was repackaged as a non-religious holiday for the sake of separation of religion and state in Japan's postwar constitution.
Pre-1945 State Shinto or Kokka Shinto is defined as the Shinto activities surrounding the support of government ideals that the government would have control over. These include day to day worship at public shrines and their messages, traditional ceremony (Kokutai Cult) and rites performed among the Imperial households, and shrines specifically symbolizing the death of fallen soldiers in battle.
On December 15, 1945, General Douglas MacArthur introduced what would later be called the Shinto Directive. The order was a directive titled the “Abolition of Governmental Sponsorship, Perpetuation, Control, and Dissemination of State Shinto″. This however was difficult due to the Emperor being at the center of many Shinto rituals. The purpose of the mandate was to separate State Shinto and Shrine Shinto which would be separating all government ties to the control of religious activities while supporting public shrines available to everyone and would be supported privately. This would later on be a part of the new Japanese constitution ratified in 1948.

Recent Japanese equinoxes

Celebrations
Shunbun no Hi is the holiday celebrating the spring (vernal) equinox. It is part of a seven-day period of festival called Haru no Higan. It is one of two points during the year, the other being in the autumn, where the daylight and night hours are of equal length, and is the official change of the seasons. 
Due to the nature of the holiday revolving around astronomical changes the date of the holiday can change from year to year but it will usually fall anywhere between March 19–22. Back in ancient times, the holiday was originally called Higan no Nakaba, which translates to “Middle of the Equinoctial Week.” The holiday was originally a time to visit loved ones' grave sites and pay homage to the ancestors. The Japanese would also take the time to renew their lives by cleaning their homes and making life changes such as starting or finishing school or a new hobby. 
Today Shunbun no Hi is a national holiday and the majority of Japanese will have the day off work to celebrate with their families. Many people will return to their homes they originally come from to spend the day with their families. The day is celebrated to bring in the spring season and to appreciate the nature blooming after a long winter. Some people will still visit their loved ones' grave sites, sweep the gravestone clear of debris, and often leave offerings of food or fresh cut flowers. The holiday is also special to farmers and agriculturalists as a day to pray for good luck and fortune for the crops they may grow in the upcoming season.

See also
 Japanese calendar
 Autumnal Equinox Day
 Nowruz, the Iranian/Persian New Year
 Northward equinox
 Songkran

References

 
 
 

Public holidays in Japan
March observances
de:Äquinoktium